Woodland is an unincorporated community in Woodland Township, Decatur County, Iowa, United States.

History
Woodland's population was 78 in 1902, and was 79 in 1925.

References

Unincorporated communities in Decatur County, Iowa
Unincorporated communities in Iowa